Gahnia subaequiglumis is a tussock-forming perennial in the family Cyperaceae, that is native to eastern parts of Australia  from  south eastern Queensland to Victoria.

References

subaequiglumis
Plants described in 1969
Flora of Queensland
Flora of Victoria (Australia)
Flora of New South Wales
Taxa named by Stanley Thatcher Blake